Hibbertia chartacea is a species of flowering plant in the family Dilleniaceae and is endemic to a restricted area of Western Australia. It is a shrub with glaucous, narrow oblong to narrow egg-shaped leaves and yellow flowers arranged on the ends of short side shoots with eleven stamens arranged in groups around the three carpels.

Description
The eleven stamens are arranged in three groups of three and two single stamens. The three carpels are more or less spherical and there is one ovule in each carpel. Flowering has been recorded in September.

Taxonomy
The specific epithet (chartacea) means "papery", referring to the texture of the sepals and bracts.

Distribution and habitat
This species has been recorded in shrubland and mallee shrubland from near Carrabin to near Bruce Rock in the Avon Wheatbelt biogeographic region.

Conservation status
Hibbertia chartacea is classified as "Priority Two" by the Western Australian Government Department of Parks and Wildlife meaning that it is poorly known and from only one or a few locations.

See also
List of Hibbertia species

References

chartacea
Flora of Western Australia
Plants described in 2004